Pankaj Moula (born 21 December 1992 in Garia in West Bengal) is an Indian professional footballer who plays as a striker for Bhawanipore in the I-League 2nd Division.

Career
Pankaj Moula who stays in Garia, started his football career as a scout of the Netaji Nagar, Kolkata coaching camp. He participated in many local tournaments where he caught the attention of football lovers with his ability to score goals.

Pankaj started his professional career in 2008 when he joined Kumortuli and then played for Mouri Sporting in the next season. In 2010, he joined Calcutta Premier Division Club Techno Aryan F.C., where he played successfully for 3 seasons.
 
Pankaj Moula has always played as a striker throughout his career. He has represented the U-19 West Bengal team, where he scored 4 goals, but unfortunately Bengal got knocked out from the quarter final stage. He also played for East Bengal in lien in the I-League U19 for 2 seasons, where he scored 8 and 6 goals respectively. Pankaj Moula emerged as the top scorer of the I-League U19 once.

Mohun Bagan
In 2013-14 season Pankaj joined Mohun Bagan. He made his debut on 14 December 2013 against Dempo S.C. at the Salt Lake Stadium in which he came on as a substitute for Ram Malik in the 46th minute as Mohun Bagan lost the match 0-1.

Personal life
Jose Ramirez Barreto being his idol, Pankaj is a big fan of Lionel Messi and always supports Argentina national football team.

Career statistics

References

External links 
 Goal Profile
I-League Profile

1992 births
Living people
Footballers from Kolkata
Indian footballers
Aryan FC players
Mohun Bagan AC players
Mohammedan SC (Kolkata) players
Association football forwards
I-League players
I-League 2nd Division players
Peerless SC players
Calcutta Football League players